Clark Lea (born November 11, 1981) is an American football coach who is currently the head football coach at Vanderbilt. He previously served as the defensive coordinator at the University of Notre Dame from 2018 to 2020. Lea began his coaching career as a graduate assistant at University of California, Los Angeles (UCLA) in 2006 and went on to serve as an assistant coach at South Dakota State University, Bowling Green State University, Syracuse University, and Wake Forest University.

Playing career
Lea started his college career playing baseball. He helped lead Birmingham Southern to the 2001 NAIA championship his freshman year. Lea then transferred to Belmont and played one year of baseball (5G, 2-for-5, K). Lea remained in Nashville and finished his college career at Vanderbilt, playing fullback his last two years.

Coaching career

UCLA
In 2006, Lea began his coaching career at UCLA as a graduate assistant under head coach Karl Dorrell.

South Dakota State
In 2007, Lea joined South Dakota State University as their linebackers coach under head coach John Stiegelmeier. In 2008, Lea was given an additional role as recruiting coordinator.

UCLA (second stint)
In 2009, Lea returned to UCLA as a graduate assistant under head coach Rick Neuheisel. In 2010, he was promoted to linebackers coach. Following Neuheisel's firing on November 28, 2011, Lea was not retained by UCLA for the 2012 season.

Bowling Green
In 2012, Lea was hired as the linebackers coach at Bowling Green State University under defensive coordinator Mike Elko and head coach Dave Clawson.

Syracuse
In 2013, Lea joined Syracuse University as their linebackers coach under head coach Scott Shafer.

Wake Forest
In 2016, Lea was hired as the linebackers coach at Wake Forest University, reuniting with defensive coordinator Mike Elko and head coach Dave Clawson.

Notre Dame
In 2017, Lea followed defensive coordinator Mike Elko to the University of Notre Dame to serve as their linebackers coach under head coach Brian Kelly. In January 2018, Lea was promoted to defensive coordinator, replacing Mike Elko, who departed to serve in the same role at Texas A&M.

Vanderbilt
On December 14, 2020, Lea was named the 29th head football coach at Vanderbilt University, replacing Derek Mason.

Head coaching record

References

External links
 Vanderbilt Commodores bio

1981 births
Living people
American football fullbacks
Belmont Bruins baseball players
Birmingham–Southern Panthers baseball players
Bowling Green Falcons football coaches
Notre Dame Fighting Irish football coaches
South Dakota State Jackrabbits football coaches
Syracuse Orange football coaches
UCLA Bruins football coaches
Vanderbilt Commodores football coaches
Vanderbilt Commodores football players
Wake Forest Demon Deacons football coaches
Baseball players from Nashville, Tennessee